Wilshire Park Elementary may refer to:

Wilshire Park Elementary, in the St. Anthony-New Brighton School District Minnesota
Wilshire Park Elementary, on List of Los Angeles Unified School District schools, California